The 2013 Australian Open wildcard playoffs and entries were a group of events and internal selections to choose the eight men and women wildcard entries for the 2013 Australian Open. Tennis Australia awarded eight wildcards for the men's and women's professional singles and doubles competitions. In an agreement with the United States Tennis Association and the French Tennis Federation, Tennis Australia gave one man and one woman from the United States and France each a wildcard into the Australian Open. A wildcard was awarded to the winner of the Australian Open wildcard playoff, a tournament between Australian players, who do not receive direct entry into the draw. The Australian Open were promoted as "the Grand Slam of Asia/Pacific"; one male and one female player from this geographical area were awarded a wildcard. This was decided through the Asia Pacific Australian Open Wildcard Playoff.

Wildcard entries
These are the wildcard qualifiers, from both internal selections and playoffs.

Men's singles

Women's singles

Men's doubles

Women's doubles

Asia-Pacific Wildcard Playoff

Men's singles

Women's singles

Men's doubles

Women's doubles

Australian Wildcard Playoff

Men's singles

Draw

Women's singles

Draw

US Wildcard Playoff

Men's singles

Women's singles

References